The following is a list of Mayors of Narva, Estonia.

List

Mayor of Narva (Russian Empire) 
Adolf Theodor Hahn (1873–1877 and 1882–1884)
Dmitri Zinovjev (14 December 1878 – 29 December 1881)
Aleksandr Svinkin (1886–1894)
Pjotr Pankov (1898–1902)
Alfons Tatarin (26 November 1902 – 12 March 1910)
Aleksei Ossipov (25 April 1910 – 21 March 1917)
Ants Dauman (1917–1918)

Mayor of Narva (post-independence) 
Eduard Alfred Dieckhoff (1918)
Albert Tiimann (1918–1919)
Robert Astrem (1919)
Anton Võhmar (Võhman) (1921–1922)
Johannes Hermann (1922–1924)
Jaan Luts (1924–1927)
Johannes Hermann (1927–1930)
Jaan Luts (1930–1936)
Jaan Lust (1936–1940)

Mayor of Narva (German Estonia) 
Johan Hansing (1940)
Leonhard Vahter (1941–1942)
Richard Rubach (1943)

Chairman of the Executive Committee of the Narva City Council of People's Deputies (Estonian SSR) 
Vassili Kala (–1946)
Meta Vannas (1960–1969)
Aleksandr Zamahhin (1969–1973)
S. Boborenko (1973–1975)
Heino Urm (1975–1979)
Valeri Tšetvergov (1979–1982) 
Eduard Rõžakov (1982–1985)
Vladimir Mižui (1985–1991)

Mayor of Narva (1991-present) 

 Vladimir Mižui (1991–1993)
Raivo Murd (1993–1998)
Eldar Efendijev (1998–2000)
Imre Liiv (2000–2002)
Tarmo Tammiste (2002–2013)
Eduard East (2013–2015)
Tarmo Tammiste (2015–2019)
 Aleksei Jevgrafov (2019-30 December 2020)
 Katri Raik (since 30 December 2020)

References

 List of mayors of Narva
Narva